George "Tic" Price (born November 29, 1955) is an American college basketball coach.  He last coached the Lamar Cardinals men's basketball team. From 2002 to 2007, he served as head coach at McNeese State.  Prior to that, he served as head coach of Memphis and New Orleans.  Price’s daughter is Sports Illustrated model Chanel Iman, who married NFL wide receiver Sterling Shepard in 2017. He is married to the former Jamie Lynn Simms, and the couple has two children - son, Ryan, a college basketball coach who played for his father at McNeese, and daughter, Chanel. He has three grandaughters - Bella Grace Price, Cali Clay Shepard and Cassie Snow Shepard.

Currently, Price works as an analyst on ESPN+ college basketball broadcasts for the Southland Conference and the University of New Orleans. He is also releasing a book focusing on his life and coaching career titled Locker Room Talk in 2022.

Coaching career

University of New Orleans
Price went to New Orleans as an assistant coach under Tommy Joe Eagles in 1994, but was named head coach after Eagles' unexpected death in July 1994. After a 20-win inaugural season, Price led the Privateers to a mark of 21–9 in 1995–96, claiming the Sun Belt Conference championship with a 57–56 victory over Arkansas–Little Rock and received a bid to the NCAA tournament where the team lost to North Carolina. In 1996–97, the Privateers posted a record of 22–7 and participated in the National Invitation Tournament. Price became the first coach to win 20 or more games in three consecutive seasons at New Orleans, while setting the Sun Belt Conference career record for winning percentage in league games (.759) and collecting a record 22 consecutive conference home wins.

University of Memphis

Price became Memphis's 14th head coach on March 27, 1997. In his first year at the helm, Price and the Tigers exceeded all expectations by going 17–12, winning the National Division of Conference USA and advancing to the NIT. His second season was a disappointment as a young but talented Tiger team posted a 13–15 record. He was forced to resign days before the start of what would have been his third season because of an inappropriate sexual relationship with a student.

McNeese State University

Price was hired as an assistant at McNeese State in 2000. Prior to  the 2001–02 season, Price took over the McNeese State program following Ron Everheart leaving to coach Northeastern University. In his first season, he guided the Cowboys to the nation's largest turnaround, posting a 22-9 record, capturing a Southland Conference regular season title, and securing a berth in the NCAA tournament. Price went 74–68 in his five seasons with McNeese State. His contract was not renewed following the 2006 season.

North Texas 
Price spent one season as an assistant at North Texas in 2007–08.

Lamar University
Price served as an assistant coach at Lamar from 2008 to 2011. He remained at Lamar as associate vice president of student engagement thereafter. However, on February 16, 2014—with five games to go in the 2013-14 season—Lamar president Kenneth Evans fired head coach Pat Knight and named Price interim head coach for the remainder of the season. Price initially said he had no desire to ever coach again, but Evans told him that it wasn't an offer, but an order.  Under Price, the Cardinals finished the 2013–14 season with a 1–4 record. On March 18, 2014, Lamar removed the "interim" tag from Price's title and formally named him as its 11th head coach.  Price's first full season ended with an overall record of 15–15 and a conference record of 9–9.  In 2018–19, Lamar finished tied for third place in the Southland Conference with a 20–13, 12–6 record finishing out the season with 9 wins in its final 10 games and eleven wins of its final 13 games.  The 20 win season was the first one for the Cardinals since 2011–12 after missing the 20 win mark by one game the previous two seasons.  It was Price's fifth 20 win season as a head coach.

Head coaching record

References

1955 births
Living people
American men's basketball coaches
American men's basketball players
Auburn Tigers men's basketball coaches
Basketball coaches from Virginia
Basketball players from Virginia
College men's basketball head coaches in the United States
Lamar Cardinals basketball coaches
McNeese Cowboys basketball coaches
Memphis Tigers men's basketball coaches
New Orleans Privateers men's basketball coaches
North Texas Mean Green men's basketball coaches
Old Dominion Monarchs men's basketball coaches
Roanoke Maroons men's basketball coaches
Small forwards
Sportspeople from Danville, Virginia
VCU Rams men's basketball players
Virginia Tech Hokies men's basketball coaches
Virginia Tech Hokies men's basketball players